Iranikulam is a village in the southern part of Thrissur district in Kerala, India. It is considered one of the oldest villages in Kerala. Iranikulam is one of the 64 Brahmin villages in Kerala. One of the oldest Shiva temples is situated here. Iranikulam is famous for its culture. Most of the people in this village are farmers. The Temple is one of the few temples in the world where Shiva & Parvati are both consecrated under the same roof. Please visit www.iranikulamtemple.com for further reference. Population of this village is very less compared to other villages in Kerala. Government school of this village is one of the oldest. Pin code is 680734.

Gallery

See also

 Iranikulam Sree Mahadeva Temple

References

Villages in Thrissur district